Callistus lunatus is a species of ground beetle in the genus Callistus.

Distribution
It is native to the Palearctic (including Europe) and the Near East. In Europe, it is found in Albania, Austria, Belarus, Belgium, Bosnia and Herzegovina, Bulgaria, Croatia, the Czech Republic, European Turkey, mainland France, Germany, Great Britain including the Isle of Man, mainland Greece, Hungary, mainland Italy, Kaliningrad, Latvia (doubtful), Liechtenstein, Luxembourg, Moldova, North Macedonia, Poland, mainland Portugal, Romania, Russia (except in the Northwest), Slovenia, mainland Spain, Switzerland, the Netherlands, Ukraine and Yugoslavia.

References

External links

Licininae
Beetles described in 1775
Taxa named by Johan Christian Fabricius